George Delmar Thompson (September 26, 1899 – September 19, 1939) was an American football player.  He played college football for Iowa and professional football in the National Football League (NFL) as a guard and tackle for the Rock Island Independents from 1923 to 1925. He appeared in 27 NFL games, 25 as a starter.

References

1899 births
1939 deaths
Rock Island Independents players
Iowa Hawkeyes football players